James Fearon (1746–1789) was a British stage actor.

From 1768 to 1771 he acted in Edinburgh and Glasgow, before making his London debut at Haymarket Theatre. He appeared in London until his death, mainly at the Covent Garden Theatre, whose company he joined in 1774.

Selected roles
 Benfield senior in The Maid of Bath by Samuel Foote (1771)
 Coachman in The Rivals by Richard Brinsley Sheridan (1775)
 Officer in The Count of Narbonne by Robert Jephson (1781)
 David in More Ways Than One by Hannah Cowley (1783)
 Vasquez in A Bold Stroke for a Husband by Hannah Cowley (1783)

References

Bibliography
 Cox, Jeffrey N. & Gamer, Michael. The Broadview Anthology of Romantic Drama. Broadview Press, 2003.
 Highfill, Philip H, Burnim, Kalman A. & Langhans, Edward A. A Biographical Dictionary of Actors, Actresses, Musicians, Dancers, Managers, and Other Stage Personnel in London, 1660-1800. SIU Press, 1973.

18th-century English people
English male stage actors
British male stage actors
18th-century English male actors
18th-century British male actors
1746 births
1789 deaths